The Stone Gate (Kamenita vrata) is a 1992 Croatian film directed by Ante Babaja, starring Ivica Kunčević and Vedrana Međimorec.

Plot
Branko Boras, a physician (Ivica Kunčević), is writing a book about the afterlife. Alienated from the world, with a failed marriage behind him, he meets Ana (Vedrana Međimorec), a somewhat mysterious woman who is a wife of a nouveau riche (Kruno Šarić). In her, Boras recognizes a soulmate, and they become close. His health is however, seriously failing, and reality and imagination begin to mix on his journey to the beyond...

Sources

External links
 

1992 films
1990s Croatian-language films
Films directed by Ante Babaja
Croatian drama films
Films set in Zagreb
1992 drama films